Bolt is a 1995 drama film directed by Henri Colline and George Mendeluk and starring Richard Grieco in the title role as a New Jersey biker. After fleeing west to escape a gang war, Bolt becomes romantically involved with Native American Patty Deerheart (Sean Young), and is compelled to battle to protect her family from a land runner. The appearance of former gang rival Billy Niles (Michael Ironside) on the reservation causes the conflict to escalate into a violent climax. It was released on DVD as Rebel Run in 1999.

The movie received generally poor reviews, and Sean Young later said that the cast referred to the film as "Blot".

References

External links

1994 films
1994 drama films
American drama films
1990s English-language films
Films directed by George Mendeluk
1990s American films